Block Breaker Deluxe 2 is a sequel of Block Breaker Deluxe video game developed by Gameloft for mobile phones. It was also released in operating systems for iOS and Android. Gameloft claims it is the most played arcade wall breaking on mobile platforms. The game is not available in WiiWare, N-Gage, and  Windows PCs unlike in the original.

Gameplay
The game and the object is the same as the original, the improvements of the game is added more power-ups, locations, levels, challenges, added more stuffs in the shop and new designed blocks.

References

2008 video games
Breakout clones
Mobile games
Gameloft games
Multiplayer and single-player video games